Anna Hornby, (6 April 1914–1996) was an English painter, calligrapher and member of the New English Art Club.

Life and work
Anna Hornby was educated at the independent Westonbirt School, Gloucestershire. She went on to study art in Florence with landscape and flower painter Aubrey Waterfield in 1934, and later that year enrolled at the Byam Shaw School of Art in London where she studied under Francis Ernest Jackson, graduating in 1940.

In 1952 Hornby was appointed Honorary Secretary of the Society for Italic Handwriting, a post she held until 1962. Through her interest in calligraphy and her association with the Society, Hornby became acquainted with Alfred John Fairbank, whose portrait she painted (exhibited at the Royal Academy in 1961). Fairbank was a founding member of the Society of Scribes and Illuminators in 1921, and was also involved in the foundation of the Society for Italic Handwriting in 1952.

Hornby was also a member of the Art Workers Guild and was elected member of the New English Art Club in 1971. She exhibited widely with 13 pictures at the Royal Academy. In addition she exhibited with the Royal Society of Painters in Watercolours, The Royal Society of Portrait Painters and the Royal Society of British Artists.

Anna Hornby died in 1996, bequeathing paintings by Peter Greenham and Francis Ernest Jackson to the Ashmolean Museum of Art, Oxford. Many of her papers and letters, including correspondence with Alfred John Fairbank are held in the archives of the Bodleian Library, University of Oxford and the National Art Library, London.

Exhibitions
Pictures exhibited at the Royal Academy, London
1949 - Chantmarle
1959 - Cecily
1960 - Farm near Urbino
1960 - Mary
1961 - Evening Tuscany
1961 - Sally
1961 - Alfred Fairbank Esq
1963 - Le Buis: Morning
1967 - Washing Line
1968 - Crocuses
1968 - Italian Haystacks
1969 - College Dustbins
1970 - Certaldo in the Rain

References

1914 births
1996 deaths
20th-century English painters
20th-century English women artists
Alumni of the Byam Shaw School of Art
English calligraphers
English women painters
People educated at Westonbirt School
Women calligraphers